Amieira may refer to the following places in Portugal:

 Amieira (Oleiros), former parish in the municipality of Oleiros
 Amieira (Portel), former parish in the municipality of Portel
 Amieira do Tejo, former parish in the municipality of Nisa
 Amieira e Alqueva, civil parish in the municipality of Portel